George W. Smith may refer to:

George W. Smith (judge) (1820s–1873), Justice of the Supreme Court of Texas
George W. Smith (USMC) (1925–2014), Major general in the U.S. Marine Corps
George W. Smith Jr., Lieutenant general in the U.S. Marine Corps
George W. Smith (footballer), Scottish-born footballer for Chelsea in the 1920s and 1930s
George Warwick Smith (1916–1999), Australian public servant
George Washington Smith (architect) (1876–1930), American architect
George Washington Smith (congressman) (1846–1907), U.S. Representative from Illinois
George Wayne Smith (born 1955), bishop of the Episcopal Diocese of Missouri
George Weissinger Smith (1864–1931), mayor of Louisville, Kentucky, 1917–1921
George Wilbert Smith (1855–1931), Alberta Member of the Legislative Assembly
George William Smith (politician) (1762–1811), governor of Virginia
George William Smith (sportsman) (1874–1954), New Zealand track athlete, and rugby union and rugby league footballer

See also
George Smith (disambiguation)